David Guest (born  in Bristol) is an English bodybuilder and weightlifter. He is a multiple British champion in weightlifting and a world champion in bodybuilding.

Biography 

Guest was born in Bristol, South West England. He has had a successful career in weightlifting. He started competing at the age of 14. He is an eight-time winner of British weightlifting championships, being awarded with gold medals in 1994−2002. He was selected to represent England at the Commonwealth Games. Being approximately 30 years old, he decided to renounce his weightlifting career, considering that its conditions negatively affect his joints. He became a bodybuilder.

Guest founds his major bodybuilding inspiration in Dorian Yates. He's a member of the National Amateur Body-Builders' Association (NABBA). In 2009 he placed first four times during two different contests: at NABBA's West Britain and England Championships he was a Class 2 (Medium-Tall) category and overall winner. In Spring 2010 he became Mr Britain; he competed in Great Britain Championships in Southport and was honoured with two gold medals, in Class 2 and overall category. The same year he participated in the world's most prestigious bodybuilding competition, Mr Universe. He placed second in Class 2 category. In 2011 Guest became an overall winner of NABBA's England Championships. He also placed first in Class 2 (Medium-Tall) category at Mr Universe.

During competition season, trying to get his body in perfect shape, Guest works out twice a day. His contest weight is approximately 254 lb (115 kg

Competitive stats 
 Height: 5 ft 9 in (175 cm)
 Contest weight: 254 lb (115 kg)
 Off-season weight: ~275 lb (125 kg)

Partial bodybuilding competitions 
 2009: West Britain Bodybuilding Championships, NABBA, Class 2 (Medium-Tall) — 1st
 2009: West Britain Bodybuilding Championships, NABBA, Overall — 1st
 2009: English Midlands Bodybuilding Championships, NABBA, Overall — 4th
 2009: England Bodybuilding Championships, NABBA, Class 2 (Medium-Tall) — 1st
 2009: England Bodybuilding Championships, NABBA, Overall — 1st
 2009: Great Britain Bodybuilding Championships, NABBA, Class 2 (Medium-Tall) — 2nd
 2009: Mr. Universe, NABBA, Class 2 (Medium-Tall) — 3rd
 2010: Great Britain Bodybuilding Championships, NABBA, Class 2 (Medium-Tall) — 1st
 2010: Great Britain Bodybuilding Championships, NABBA, Overall — 1st
 2010: Mr. Universe, NABBA, Class 2 (Medium-Tall) — 2nd
 2011: England Bodybuilding Championships, NABBA, Class 2 (Medium-Tall) — 1st
 2011: England Bodybuilding Championships, NABBA, Overall — 1st
 2011: Mr. Universe, NABBA, Class 2 (Medium-Tall) — 1st

Partial weightlifting competitions 
 1994−2002: Great Britain Championships, Men's 94 kg class — 1st
 2002: Commonwealth Games, Men's 94 kg class — 2nd
 snatch — 2nd

References 

1978 births
English bodybuilders
English strength athletes
English male weightlifters
Living people
Sportspeople from Bristol
Weightlifters at the 2002 Commonwealth Games
Commonwealth Games medallists in weightlifting
Commonwealth Games silver medallists for England
Medallists at the 2002 Commonwealth Games